The Logan/Esterly Upper Ditch is an abandoned, artificial watercourse in the Illinois River Valley of northern California and southern Oregon, United States. Built in 1854 to supply water from the river's East Fork in California to several hydraulic mines in Oregon, it quickly returned a large profit to its investors. The ditch supplied mines worked by its own owners, as well as providing water for sale to other nearby diggings and incidentally powering at least one sawmill. Mines it served include the Waldo, Fry Gulch, and Cameron mines. It continued in operation until 1942, when the last hydraulic mining operations in the upper Illinois Valley ceased. Several wooden structures associated with the ditch, such as trestles and flumes, disappeared by the end of the 20th century, but the earthen components remained mostly intact.

See also
National Register of Historic Places listings in Josephine County, Oregon
National Register of Historic Places listings in Del Norte County, California
Osgood Ditch

References

External links

1854 establishments in Oregon Territory
1854 establishments in California
National Register of Historic Places in Josephine County, Oregon
National Register of Historic Places in Del Norte County, California
History of mining in the United States
Mining in Oregon
Mining in California